Oscar I may refer to:
 Oscar I of Sweden, king of Sweden and Norway
 Oscar I submarine, a class of Russian submarines
 OSCAR 1, the first amateur radio satellite